Michaela Španková (born 1 August 1999) is a Slovak female volleyball player. She is part of the Slovakia women's national volleyball team. She competed at the 2019 Women's European Volleyball Championship.

Clubs
  VKM Piešťany (2010–2014)
  COP NITRA (2014–2016)
  Volley project UKF Nitra (2016–2018)
  Strabag VC FTVŠ UK Bratislava (2018–2019)

References

External links 

 Profile on CEV

1999 births
Living people
Slovak women's volleyball players
Sportspeople from Liptovský Mikuláš